Enrico Nigiotti (born 11 June 1987) is an Italian singer-songwriter.
After signing a recording deal with Sugar Music, he released his debut single, "Addio", in 2008. Between 2009 and 2010, he was a contestant in the ninth series of Italian talent show Amici di Maria De Filippi. He decided to leave the competition to avoid an elimination round against his then-girlfriend, dancer Elena D'Amario. His eponymous extended play was released by Sugar on 26 March 2010, and entered the top 50 of the FIMI Italian Albums Chart.

In 2015, Nigiotti competed in the Newcomers' section of the 65th Sanremo Music Festival, performing the song "Qualcosa da decidere". After advancing in the first elimination round, he was eliminated during one of the two semi-finals by eventual winner Giovanni Caccamo. The song was released as the lead single from his first full-length studio album, also titled Qualcosa da decidere and released by Universal Music Group's label Go Wild. The album failed to achieve commercial success.

In 2017, Nigiotti auditioned for the eleventh series of the Italian version of X Factor. He placed third in the final, and signed with Sony Music Italy. His single "L'amore è" peaked at number 4 on the Italian FIMI Singles Chart and was included in the EP with the same title, also including covers previously performed during the live shows.

After releasing the singles "Nel silenzio di mille parole" and "Complici", performed in a duet with Gianna Nannini, Nigiotti released the album Cenerentola (Sony Music Italy) in Autumn 2018. In February 2019, he competed in the 69th Sanremo Music Festival with the song "Nonno Hollywood", which received the Lunezia Award for Best Music-Literary Value among the contest's entries.

He participated at the Sanremo Music Festival 2020 with the song "Baciami adesso".

As a songwriter, he penned songs for Laura Pausini and Eros Ramazzotti.

References

External links

Enrico Nigiotti at Allmusic
Enrico Nigiotti at IMDb

1987 births
Italian pop singers
Living people
X Factor (Italian TV series) contestants
People from Livorno
21st-century Italian male singers
Italian male singer-songwriters